Dalton v. Specter, 511 U.S. 462 (1994), was a case in which the United States Supreme Court held that an Executive Order to shut down the Philadelphia Naval Base was not subject to judicial review. In an opinion written by Chief Justice William Rehnquist, the Court held that the decision to close the base was not subject to review under the Administrative Procedure Act because the decision to close the base did not constitute the final action of an agency. Additionally, the Court held that the decision to close the base, which was made pursuant to the Defense Base Closure and Realignment Act of 1990, was not subject to judicial review because the 1990 Act "commits decisionmaking to the discretion of the President".

See also
 List of United States Supreme Court cases, volume 511
 List of United States Supreme Court cases
 Lists of United States Supreme Court cases by volume
 List of United States Supreme Court cases by the Rehnquist Court

References

External links
 

United States Supreme Court cases
United States administrative case law
1994 in United States case law
United States Supreme Court cases of the Rehnquist Court